Frederick Henshaw may refer to:

 Frederick Henry Henshaw (1807–1891), English artist
 Frederick W. Henshaw (1858–1929), American attorney and judge